The Kissock Block Building is a historic commercial building located at 115–121 East Mountain Avenue in Fort Collins, Colorado. The two-story brick structure was completed in 1889 and was designed and built by local builder-architect Montezuma Fuller. It was listed on the National Register of Historic Places in 1985.

References

Commercial buildings on the National Register of Historic Places in Colorado
Commercial buildings completed in 1889
Buildings and structures in Fort Collins, Colorado
National Register of Historic Places in Larimer County, Colorado